The Institute for International Development (IID) is an Australian company limited by guarantee, which provides professional services in support of equitable international development. It does this through consultancies to major international agencies and its own development, publication, exchange, and related cultural activities. IID is based in Adelaide and operates globally.

The founders of IID, who had previously built up the group MPW Australia in the 1980s, considered that international aid should change to reflect development needs. In the face of this change proceeding slowly, the organization operates within its mandate to further objectives of international understanding while it conducts selected professional assignments for such agencies as UN, World Bank, Asian Development Bank, NGOs and AusAID.

Sector expertise encompasses most disciplines related to rural development, including agriculture, social, economic, health and education development. Geographic experience includes most Asian countries, particularly Central, South and Southeast Asia.

External links
 IID website

Non-profit organisations based in Australia
International development agencies